Ruthenium(IV) oxide is the inorganic compound with the formula RuO2.  This black solid is the most common oxide of ruthenium.  It is widely used as an electrocatalyst for producing chlorine, chlorine oxides, and O2. Like many dioxides, RuO2 adopts the rutile structure.

Preparation
It is usually prepared by oxidation of ruthenium trichloride.  Nearly stoichiometric single crystals of RuO2 can be obtained by chemical vapor transport, using O2 as the transport agent:

RuO2  +  O2   RuO4

Films of RuO2 can be prepared by chemical vapor deposition (CVD) from volatile ruthenium compounds.  RuO2 can also be prepared through electroplating from a solution of ruthenium trichloride.

Electrostatically stabilized hydrosols of pristine ruthenium dioxide hydrate have been prepared by exploiting the autocatalytic reduction of ruthenium tetroxide in aqueous solution. The resulting particle populations may be controlled to comprise substantially monodisperse, uniform spheres with diameters in the range 40nm - 160nm.

Uses
Ruthenium(IV) oxide is being used as the main component in the catalyst of the Sumitomo-Deacon process which produces chlorine by the oxidation of hydrogen chloride.

RuO2 can be used as catalyst in many other situations.  Noteworthy reactions are the Fischer–Tropsch process, Haber–Bosch process, and various manifestations of fuel cells.

Potential and niche applications
RuO2 is extensively used for the coating of titanium anodes for the electrolytic production of chlorine and for the preparation of resistors or integrated circuits. Ruthenium oxide resistors can be used as sensitive thermometers in the temperature range .02 < T < 4 K. It can be also used as active material in supercapacitor because it has very high charge transfer capability.  Ruthenium oxide has great capacity to store charge when used in aqueous solutions. Average capacities of ruthenium(IV) oxide have reached 650 F/g when in H2SO4 solution and annealed at temperatures lower than 200 °C. In attempts to optimise its capacitive properties, prior work has looked at the hydration of ruthenium oxide, its crystallinity and particle size.

References

External links

 Los Alamos National Laboratory – Ruthenium

Ruthenium(IV) compounds
Transition metal oxides